Yosemite Forks is an unincorporated community in Madera County, California. The road forks at the place: one continues to Yosemite Valley, the other to Bass Lake.

References

Unincorporated communities in California
Unincorporated communities in Madera County, California